Let's Get Physical is an American television sitcom created by Ben Newmark, Dan Newmark and Connor Pritchard. The series stars Matt Jones, Misha Rasaiah, AnnaLynne McCord, Chris Diamantopoulos, Jane Seymour, Jahmil French, James Cade and Dylan Bailey. The series premiered on Pop on January 24, 2018.

Cast 
Matt Jones as Joe Force
Misha Rasaiah as Tina Gray
AnnaLynne McCord as Claudia 
Chris Diamantopoulos as Barry Cross
Jane Seymour as Janet
Jahmil French as Snacks
James Cade as Clarence
Dylan Bailey as Chad R.
Lee J. Campbell as Colonel Force
David Rossetti as Andre
Rhys Bevan-John as Gout
Michael Ratchford as Rick
Adrian Choong as Chad P.
Kristin Langille as Denise

Episodes

References

External links
 

2018 American television series debuts
2018 American television series endings
2010s American sitcoms
English-language television shows
Pop (American TV channel) original programming
Television series by Entertainment One